Rear Admiral Robert Wilson Shufeldt (1822–1895) was a 19th-century officer in the United States Navy best known for his negotiation of the 1882 Shufeldt Treaty with Korea, the first treaty signed by that country with a Western nation. He was commander of the USS Wachusett and USS Ticonderoga, and Consul-General of the United States to Cuba.

Personal life
Robert Wilson Shufeldt was born in Red Hook, New York on February 21, 1822. He was married in 1848 to Sarah Hutchins Abercrombie, daughter of Reverend James Abercrombie. Their first child, Robert Wilson Shufeldt Jr (1850-1895) was a medical doctor and pioneer in the study of ancient human remains, ornithology, and an advocate of white supremacy. Their adopted daughter, Mary Abercrombie Shufeldt, accompanied her father to China on a diplomatic mission in 1881 and acted as his secretary. She later donated ethnographic material from her travels to the Smithsonian Institute.

Naval and diplomatic career
Shufeldt studied at Middlebury College from 1837 until 1839, but left before graduation to join the United States Navy as a midshipman. After the outbreak of the American Civil War, Shufeldt was appointed to the position of Consul-General of the United States' mission in Havana, Cuba, likely with the support of Secretary of State William Seward. As Consul-General to Cuba from 1861 to 1863, he played a role in the Trent Affair. 

He returned to the Navy in 1863, and commanded a ship blockading Southern ports. Following the war, he commanded USS Wachusett. In 1867, he attempted to investigate the sinking of the SS General Sherman in Korea, but was forced to turn back by bad winter weather. During the 1860s and 1870s, Shufeldt became established in naval circles as an advocate of reform and the expansion of trade. Between this reputation and his strong political connections, he was appointed the first head of the newly formed Bureau of Equipment and Recruiting, which eventually became the Navy's Bureau of Naval Personnel.

He returned to Korea as the captain of the USS Ticonderoga during her circumnavigation of the globe in 1878, establishing relationships with Japanese and Chinese diplomats and political leaders in the region, including Li Hongzhang. As a result of that interest, he was appointed the American representative to the 1882 Treaty of Peace, Amity, Commerce and Navigation with Korea, known in the West as the "Shufeldt Treaty," which negotiated protection for shipwrecked sailors, commerce regulations, and a most-favored nation status for the United States.

Shufeldt returned to California in July 1882, and spent the next few months recuperating while the Senate ratified the treaty with Korea. He returned to Washington in 1883, where he was made the President of the Naval Advisory Board and the Superintendent of the U.S. Naval Observatory, and was promoted to Rear Admiral. Shufeldt retired from the Navy in 1884, and visited Korea once more as a private citizen following his retirement. He died of pneumonia on November 7, 1895, in Washington, D.C., and is buried in Arlington National Cemetery.

Works
 
 ---, "Secret History of the Slave Trade to Cuba Written By an American Naval Officer, Robert Wilson Schufeldt, 1861 edited by Frederick C. Drake, The Journal of Negro History 1970 55:3: 218-235.

References

Further reading

External links
 Robert W. Shufeldt Arlington National Cemetery
 

1822 births
1895 deaths
Middlebury College alumni
United States Navy sailors
American diplomats